Daniel L. Fields (born January 23, 1991) is an American former professional baseball outfielder. He played one game in Major League Baseball (MLB) for the Detroit Tigers in 2015.

He is the first player since Steve Kuczek in 1949 to hit a double and the first player since Gary Martz in 1975 to play left field in his only career Major League game.

Career

Detroit Tigers
Fields was drafted by the Detroit Tigers in the sixth round of the 2009 Major League Baseball Draft out of University of Detroit Jesuit High School and Academy in Detroit Michigan. Fields started his career with the High-A Lakeland Flying Tigers in 2010. He hit .240/.343/.371 with eight home runs. He spent the 2011 season with Lakeland hitting .220/.308/.326 with eight home runs. He again started the 2012 season with Lakeland but was promoted to Double-A Erie SeaWolves after hitting .266/.318/.357 with one home run in 62 games. In 29 games with Erie he hit .264/.352/.358 with two home runs. He spent the 2013 season with Erie, hitting .284/.356/.435. He was added to the Tigers 40-man roster on November 20, 2013. He played for Erie, the Gulf Coast Tigers and Triple-A Toledo Mud Hens in 2014 and started the 2015 season with Toledo.

Fields was called up to the majors for the first time on June 2, 2015. Fields made his major league debut on June 4. He recorded his first career major league hit, a double in the 9th inning off Dan Otero of the Oakland Athletics. He was designated for assignment by the Tigers on September 8, 2015. Fields struggled down the stretch, batting just .206 (52-for-253) to finish with a .229 (103-for-450) average, 26 doubles, eight triples, seven home runs, 41 RBIs and 17 stolen bases with the Mud Hens.

Chicago White Sox / Los Angeles Dodgers
Fields was claimed off waivers by the Milwaukee Brewers on September 10, 2015. On December 7, 2015, he was then claimed off waivers by the Los Angeles Dodgers. They designated him for assignment on December 30 and he was claimed on waivers by the Chicago White Sox on January 7. He hit .216 in 32 games for the AAA Charlotte Knights and was released on May 27, 2016 and re-signed with the Dodgers on a minor league contract on June 7. He played in 10 games for the Oklahoma City Dodgers and hit .250. The Dodgers released him on August 4, 2016.

Arizona Diamondbacks
Fields signed a minor league contract with the Arizona Diamondbacks in February 2017. He was released on March 27, 2017.

Bridgeport Bluefish
On April 11, 2017, Fields signed with the Bridgeport Bluefish of the Atlantic League of Professional Baseball.

Long Island Ducks
On November 1, 2017, Fields was drafted by the Long Island Ducks in the Bridgeport Bluefish dispersal draft. On March 1, 2018, he signed with the Ducks for the 2018 season. He re-signed with the team for the 2019 season. He became a free agent at the end of the season. In February 2020, Fields signed with the Ducks for the 2020 season. In May 2021, Fields re-signed with the Ducks for the 2021 season. On April 6, 2022 he signed with the Ducks for the 2022 season.

Charleston Dirty Birds
On May 10, 2022, Fields was traded to the Charleston Dirty Birds in exchange for a player to be named later. However, 3 days later, Fields retired from professional baseball.

Personal life
Fields is the son of former MLB player, Bruce Fields.

References

External links

1991 births
Living people
African-American baseball players
Baseball players from Detroit
Major League Baseball outfielders
Detroit Tigers players
Erie SeaWolves players
Glendale Desert Dogs players
Gulf Coast Tigers players
Lakeland Flying Tigers players
Toledo Mud Hens players
University of Detroit Jesuit High School and Academy alumni
Charlotte Knights players
Great Lakes Loons players
Oklahoma City Dodgers players
Tulsa Drillers players
Bridgeport Bluefish players
Long Island Ducks players
21st-century African-American sportspeople